Deuteropoda or "upper stem group arthropods" is a proposed clade of arthropods whose members are distinguished by an anatomical reorganization of the head region, namely the appearance of a differentiated first appendage pair (the 'deutocerebral' pair), a multisegmented head, and a hypostome/labrum complex.

The clade contains all living arthropods (i.e. chelicerates and mandibulates) as well as several fossil groups that share these characteristics (e.g. fuxianhuiids, megacheirans and Artiopoda), while excluding other fossil groups that are more 'basal' or 'primitive' (e.g. anomalocarids and lobopodians).

Defining characteristics
Members of Deuteropoda are characterized by the presence of a differentiated labrum and a differentiated first 'deutocerebral' pair of appendages. In contrast, lobopodians (part of the "lower stem group") and onychophorans have a pair of pre-ocular or 'protocerebral' appendages, which presumably have evolved to be the labrum of modern living arthropods.

Phylogeny
The cladogram below is a simplified summary of the panarthropod phylogeny, taking into account the differentiation between "lower stem group arthropods" and "upper stem group arthropods" as well as two new fossils found to be the most early branches of Deuteropoda (living groups are marked in bold).

References

Unranked clades
Arthropods